The 2015–16 Fordham Rams women's basketball team represented Fordham University during the 2015–16 NCAA Division I women's basketball season. The Rams were led by fifth-year head coach Stephanie Gaitley. They were members of the Atlantic 10 Conference and played their home games at the Rose Hill Gymnasium. They finished the season 14–17, 8–8 in A-10 play to finish in a tie for sixth place. They advanced to the quarterfinals of the A-10 women's tournament where they lost to Duquesne.

2015–16 media

Forham Rams Sports Network
Forham Rams games will be broadcast on WFUV Sports and streamed online through the Fordham Portal. Most home games will also be featured on the A-10 Digital Network. Select games will be televised.

Roster

Schedule

|-
!colspan=9 style="background:#76032E; color:#FFFFFF;"| Exhibition

|-
!colspan=9 style="background:#76032E; color:#FFFFFF;"| Non-conference regular season

|-
!colspan=9 style="background:#76032E; color:#FFFFFF;"| A-10 regular season

|-
!colspan=9 style="background:#880038; color:#FFFFFF;"| Atlantic 10 Women's Tournament

Rankings

See also
 2015–16 Fordham Rams men's basketball team

References

Fordham
Fordham Rams women's basketball seasons
Fordham
Fordham